Lorenzo Ricci (born 13 May 1971 in Sarzana) is a Paralympic athlete from Italy competing mainly in category T11 sprint events.

Lorenzo competed in the 100m and 200m at both the 2000 and 2004 Summer Paralympics winning a gold medal in the T11 100m in 2000.  He also won a gold as part of the Italian 4 × 100 m for T13 in 2004.

References

External links 
 
 

1971 births
Living people
Paralympic athletes of Italy
Paralympic gold medalists for Italy
Athletes (track and field) at the 2000 Summer Paralympics
Medalists at the 2000 Summer Paralympics
Paralympic medalists in athletics (track and field)
Italian male sprinters
Athletes (track and field) at the 2004 Summer Paralympics
Visually impaired sprinters
Paralympic sprinters